The wXw World Tag Team Championship is a professional wrestling world tag team championship contested for in the German professional wrestling promotion, Westside Xtreme Wrestling (wXw). The inaugural champions was Swi$$ Money Holding (Claudio Castagnoli and Ares). They claim to have bought the titles on June 1, 2001. 

There have been a total of 61 reigns shared between 50 different teams consisting of 75 distinctive champions. The current holders are Arrows Of Hungary (Dover and Icarus) who are in their second reign as a team, as well as individually.

Title history 

Combined reigns

By team

By wrestler

See also
wXw Unified World Wrestling Championship
wXw Shotgun Championship

References

External links
 wXw World Tag Team Championship
Official website 
Westside Xtreme Wrestling at Online World of Wrestling
Westside Xtreme Wrestling at Wrestling-Titles.com

Westside Xtreme Wrestling championships
Tag team wrestling championships
World professional wrestling championships